The Kucheng massacre (Pinyin: Gǔtián Jiào'àn; Foochow Romanized: Kŭ-chèng Gáu-áng) was a massacre of Western Christians that took place at Gutian (at that time known in the west as Kucheng) Fujian, China on August 1, 1895. At dawn of that day, a fasting folk religious group attacked British missionaries who were then taking summer holidays at Gutian Huashan, killing eleven people and destroying two houses. The Kucheng Massacre is considered one of the worst attacks against foreigners in China prior to the Boxer Movement in 1899–1901, the only comparable event in China's missionary history being the Tianjin Massacre in 1870.

Background

In 1892, a religious movement called zhaijiao ("fasting school", so called because their followers took vows of vegetarianism) began assuming the functions of government due to the decrepit condition of Qing dynasty government in the Gutian region. They resolved disputes between villagers, banned opium, and ended the local practice of selling wives to multiple husbands. Gutian police decided not to intervene in this displacement of the functions of government. Christian missionaries were unhappy with these circumstances and asked the provincial officials to send in their own troops. In response, fasting-religion leaders decided to defend their rebellion with violence. The last letter from the murdered English missionary Robert Warren Stewart, dated April 8, describes the critical situation of affairs at Gutian:

Events

On August 1, 1895, at the time of the initial outbreak, the family of Robert W. Stewart and the other ladies were still asleep in their hill village at Gutian Huashan. The Vegetarian mob then broke in, speared the victims to death, and burnt down the houses. Only five persons survived the attack, two of whom were Mr. Stewart's children: one had one knee broken, and the other, a baby, had an eye gouged out. Those murdered at Huashan were:

Aftermath

The Qing government had suppressed the news for three days before an official telegraph was sent out from Shanghai on August 4. Western countries strongly condemned China for its connivance with the brutality and indignantly urged the guilty be punished. Under the pressure of foreign military force, the Qing government appointed a Commission of Enquiry consisting of both Chinese officials and British diplomats. All principals were soon executed, and other accessories were either banished or sentenced to life imprisonment. The supervisor of Gutian county Wang Rulin was also dismissed from office.

Stephen Livingston Baldwin, Secretary of the Methodist Episcopal Missionary Society in China, commented on the massacre in an interview from New York Times:

The newspapers also recommended that "Great Britain and the United States ... combine to teach the Chinese a lesson that will cause foreigners to be respected forever".

The bodies of the victims were buried at the mission cemetery of Fuzhou.

See also
Anti-missionary riots in China
List of massacres in China

Footnotes

External links

 Robert and Louisa Stewart: In Life and in Death
 The Vegetarian Outrage of 1895
 Nellie, Topsy and Annie - Australian Anglican Martyrs, Fujian Province, China, 1 August 1895
 Kucheng Massacre - Taranaki Herald, Volume XLIV, Issue 10404, 5 September 1895, Page 2
 Graves of the Missionaries Murdered near Foochow

Conflicts in 1895
Mass murder in 1895
Massacres in 1895
Foreign relations of the Qing dynasty
History of Christianity in China
Massacres in China
History of Fujian
1895 in China
Massacres of Christians
British people murdered abroad
August 1895 events
1895 murders in China
Persecution of Protestants